FAM20A is a protein that in humans is encoded by the FAM20A gene.

Function 

FAM20A belongs to an evolutionarily conserved family of secreted proteins expressed in many tissues. This locus encodes a protein that is likely secreted and  may function in hematopoiesis.
A mutation at this locus has been associated with amelogenesis imperfecta and gingival hyperplasia syndrome. Alternatively spliced transcript variants have been identified. [provided by RefSeq, Aug 2011]

Clinical significance 

A mutation in FAM20A was reported to be associated with amelogenesis imperfecta, an inherited enamel defect, and gingival hyperplasia syndrome.

Human mutations in FAM20A were also reported to cause Enamel-Renal Syndrome, an autosomal recessive disorder characterized by severe enamel hypoplasia, failed tooth eruption, intrapulpal calcifications, enlarged gingiva, and nephrocalcinosis.

References

Human proteins